Fortunato Pasquetti (1690–1773) was a Venetian painter of the Rococo period. He is known for his formal portraits of royalty and Venetian Patriciate. He was born in Venice and died in Portogruaro. He trained under Niccolò Cassana. He painted a portrait of Charles VI, Holy Roman Emperor.

References

1690 births
1773 deaths
18th-century Italian painters
Italian male painters
Painters from Venice
Italian Baroque painters
18th-century Italian male artists